Coby Jake Rowe (born 2 October 1995) is an English professional footballer who plays for Sutton United as a defender.

Career
Rowe played for Hillingdon Borough during the 2014–15 season, before signing for Wingate & Finchley. He later played for Haringey Borough and he was injured between October 2020 and April 2021 after rupturing a kidney during a match. He signed a new contract with Sutton in June 2021.

References

1995 births
Living people
English footballers
Hillingdon Borough F.C. players
Wingate & Finchley F.C. players
Haringey Borough F.C. players
Sutton United F.C. players
Isthmian League players
National League (English football) players
English Football League players
Association football defenders